Wholly Trinity is an album by trumpeter Jack Walrath which was recorded in 1986 and released on the Muse label in 1988.

Reception

The AllMusic review by Scott Yanow stated "This studio set is an excellent outing for trumpeter Jack Walrath who is showcased in a trio ... Stimulating and thought-provoking music".

Track listing
All compositions by Jack Walrath except where noted
 "Spherious" – 4:01
 "(The Last Remake of) I Can't Get Started" (Vernon Duke, Ira Gershwin) – 5:36
 "Killer Bunnies" – 8:05
 "Inn the Pit" (Chip Jackson) – 7:11
 "Baby, You Move Too Fast" – 7:40
 "Spontooneous" (Jack Walrath, Chip Jackson, Jimmy Madison) – 6:00

Personnel
Jack Walrath – trumpet 
Chip Jackson – bass 
Jimmy Madison – drums

References

Muse Records albums
Jack Walrath albums
1988 albums